The women's 5000 metres at the 2014 World Junior Championships in Athletics will be held at Hayward Field on 23 July.

Medalists

Records

Results

Heats

Final

References

External links
 WJC14 5000 metres schedule

5000 metres
Long distance running at the World Athletics U20 Championships
2014 in women's athletics